Calbuco is a city and commune in southern Chile administered by the  Municipality of Calbuco. Administratively Calbuco belongs to the Llanquihue Province of Los Lagos Region. The origin of the city was the Spanish Fort Calbuco founded in 1603, and became later an important fish market. The archaeological site of Monte Verde lies within the commune.

Calbuco Island is part of the commune and contains the city of Calbuco. There are thirteen other islands in the commune: Huar, Puluqui, Chidhuapi, Tabón, Mayelhue, Lín, Quenu, Quihua, Huapi Abtao, Chaullín, Caicué o lagartija, Tautil and Queullín.

History

The settlement of Calbuco grew out of the fort Fuerte San Miguel de Calbuco which was founded in 1603 by Francisco Hernández Ortiz-Pizarro. 

Calbuco was the capital of Calbuco Department, Chiloé between 1834 and 1855, and of Carelmapu Department between 1855 and 1928. It was capital of Calbuco Department, Llanquihue between 1937 and 1975.

Demographics
Of these, 12,165 (39.2%) lived in urban areas and 18,905 (60.8%) in rural areas. The population grew by 15% (4,043 persons) between the 1992 and 2002 censuses.

Settlements
Besides the town of Calbuco, Calbuco Comuna is also home to the settlements of: Pargua, Puluqui Island, San Rafael and Texas.  The town of San Rafael is across the estuary from the town of Calbuco. Texas was a refugee camp built after the 1960 earthquake on the outskirts of San Rafael; it has become semi-permanent. Pargua is the ferry port and gateway to the Chiloé Archipelago and the big island of Chiloé. Pargua was considered rural until the 2002 census, and the 800+ people on Puluqui Island are still denominated as "rural" although clustered around the bay where the daily barge docks.

Administrative divisions
Calbuco Comuna is divided into twenty districts. Alfaro, Quenu, Puluqui, Challahue, Machildad, Chucahua, Quetrolauquén, Aguantao, Huayún and Río Tambor are more sparsely populated, further away from the towns of Calbuco and San Rafael.

Administration
As a commune, Calbuco is a third-level administrative division of Chile administered by a municipal council, headed by an alcalde who is directly elected every four years. The alcalde is Rubén Cárdenas Gómez (PRSD), and the council has the following members:

 Pedro Yáñez Uribe (PRI) 
 Juan Francisco Calbucoy Guerrero (PS)
 Oscar González Almonacid (PS)
 Sergio García Alvarez (Ind-UDI)
 Iván Vásquez Gómez (PRSD) 
 Manuel Oyarzo Barría (PRO)

Within the electoral divisions of Chile, Calbuco is represented in the Chamber of Deputies by Marisol Turres (UDI) and Patricio Vallespín (PDC) as part of the 57th electoral district, together with Puerto Montt, Cochamó and Maullín. The commune is represented in the Senate by Camilo Escalona Medina (PS) and Carlos Kuschel Silva (RN) as part of the 17th senatorial constituency (Los Lagos Region).

References

External links
  Municipality of Calbuco

Communes of Chile
Populated places established in 1603
Port cities in Chile
Populated places in Llanquihue Province
1603 establishments in the Spanish Empire